Sakuntala Laguri is an Indian politician. She is elected to the 16th Lok Sabha in 2014 from Keonjhar constituency in Odisha.
She is a member of the Biju Janata Dal (BJD) political party.

See also
 Indian general election, 2014 (Odisha)

References

Living people
Lok Sabha members from Odisha
India MPs 2014–2019
Women in Odisha politics
People from Kendujhar district
21st-century Indian women politicians
21st-century Indian politicians
Year of birth missing (living people)
Biju Janata Dal politicians